Gibberula palmasola is a species of sea snail, a marine gastropod mollusk, in the family Cystiscidae.

References

palmasola
Gastropods described in 2011